Abu Ghizlan (also Romanized as Abū Ghizlān) is a village in Minubar Rural District, Arvandkenar District, Abadan County, Khuzestan Province, Iran. At the 2006 census, its population was 475, in 82 families.

References 

Populated places in Abadan County